Laurence William Graham (born 21 November 1945) is an Australian politician. He was elected to the Western Australian Legislative Council at the 2017 state election, as a Labor member in Agricultural Region. His term began on 22 May 2017 and ended on 21 May 2021 following his retirement at the 2021 state election.

Graham was a member of Greater Geraldton City Council before entering state politics.

References

1945 births
Living people
Australian Labor Party members of the Parliament of Western Australia
Members of the Western Australian Legislative Council
People from Geraldton
21st-century Australian politicians